Kamakkapalayam is a village (Gram panchayat) in Salem district, Thalaivasal block in the Indian state of Tamil Nadu.

Kamakkapalayam is about four kilometres south of Thalaivasal towards Veeraganur.

History
Kamakkapalayam was part of the Magadai Mandalam as of 1190 AD. Probably, during the Palaiyakkarar rule, this village was named after the Kameshwara temple's moolavar Kamanathar. The other villages named after Palaiyakkarar in this area include Govindampalayam, East Rajapalayam, Ammapalayam, Thennankudipalayam, Akkicheetipalayam, Ramanayakkan Palayam and Peddanayakkan Palayam.

Borders 
Aragalur, Aaraththi Akrahaaram, Thiyaganur, Thalaivasal, Deviyaakurichi, Vadagumarai, Thinkumarai, Naavazlur, Nadumedu & Veppampuundi.

Places of interest
 Selli Amman Aalayam
 Murugan Temple
 Sivan Temple
 Sri Amman Temple
 Sri Selva Vinayagar Maha Sakthi Mariamman Aalayam Vedhanayagapuram
 Kanada inscriptions on the 2 stones in the field

Infrastructure
Kamakkapalayam has 2 Panchayat Union Elementary Schools and 1 Middle Class School. One Panchayat Union Elementary School at Kamakkapalayam and the other at Nadumedu. Panchayat Union Middle Class School in Vedhanayagapuram. A Primary Health Center is located at this village. The major transportation is the road connection to Thalaivasal and Veeraganur with buses running every hour.

Notable persons
Tmt. V. Alagammal - member of Thalaivasal assembly constitution (93) of the 12th Tamil Nadu State general Assembly .

External links
Block Map
Salem District - Taluk Information

Villages in Salem district